Dihydroactinidiolide is a volatile terpene.  It has a sweet, tea-like odor and is used as a fragrance.  Dihydroactinidiolide occurs naturally in black tea, fenugreek, fire ants, mangoes, and tobacco.  It has also been prepared synthetically.

Dihydroactinidiolide is a pheromone for a variety of insects; for example, it is one of the three components of the pheromone for queen recognition of the workers of the red fire ant.

References 

Insect pheromones
Iridoids
Lactones
Sweet-smelling chemicals